The Friedhof II der Sophiengemeinde Berlin is a Protestant cemetery of the Sophienkirche in Berlin-Mitte, Germany.

Notable interments
(*) = An Ehrengrab awarded by the "Landes Berlin"
 Adam Weishaupt German philosopher, professor of civil law and later canon law, and founder of the Illuminati.
 Wilhelm Friedrich Ernst Bach* (1759–1845), composer, final grandson of Johann Sebastian Bach, Grablage: IX-5-45/46.
 Carl Bechstein* (1826–1900), pianomaker and founder of the famous piano factory, Grablage: IX-1
 Edwin Bechstein (1859–1934), pianomaker and son of Carl, grave levelled
 James Hobrecht (1825–1902), city-planner, author of the Hobrecht-Plan on sanitation, Grablage: I-V-14/16 (grave probably levelled)
 Theodor Hosemann* (1807–1875), genre painter, illustrator and caricaturist, Grablage: VIII-25-35.
 Walter Kollo* (1878–1940), composer of 30 operettas including Drei alte Schachteln, Grablage: IX-1-40+41
 Albert Lortzing* (1801–1851), opera composer (Zar und Zimmermann, Der Wildschütz), Grablage: IX-6-46+47.
 Caroline Medon (1802–1882), actress then opera singer
 Constantin Starck († 1939), sculptor, grave probably levelled
 Johanna Stegen* verehelicht Hindersin (1793–1842), "the heroine of Lüneburg", medallion by Albert Moritz Wolff, Grablage: VIII-5-23+24.
 Max Stirner*, actually Johann Caspar Schmidt (1806–1856), philosopher and author: The Ego and Its Own, Grablage: V-8-53.
 Hermann Friedrich Waesemann* (1813–1879), architect, designer of the Berliner Rathaus (the so-called "Rotes Rathaus"), Medaillon by Otto Geyer, Grablage: III-1-18+19.
 Adolf Zander (1843–1914), royal music-director, Grablage: X-26-22

References

External links
 

Cemeteries in Berlin
Lutheran cemeteries in Germany